The 1970–71 Scottish League Cup was the twenty-fifth season of Scotland's second football knockout competition. The competition was won by Rangers, who defeated Celtic in the Final breaking a run of 5 successive wins in the preceding years.

First round

Group 1

Group 2

Group 3

Group 4

Group 5

Group 6

Group 7

Group 8

Group 9

Supplementary Round

First Leg

Second Leg

Quarter-finals

First Leg

Second Leg

Semi-finals

Ties

Replay

Final

References

General

Specific

League Cup
Scottish League Cup seasons